Gari Jermaine Scott (born June 2, 1978) is a former American football wide receiver in the National Football League. He was drafted by the Philadelphia Eagles in the fourth round of the 2000 NFL Draft after playing college football for the Michigan State Spartans.

Despite largely playing in the shadow of teammate Plaxico Burress, Gari finished his Michigan State career with 134 catches for 2,095 yards and 18 TD. In 1998, he set career highs with 58 catches and 843 yards.

Scott played only one season with the Eagles. During that season, he played in three games and had two receptions for 26 yards.

References

1978 births
Living people
Players of American football from Florida
American football wide receivers
Michigan State Spartans football players
Philadelphia Eagles players
Sportspeople from West Palm Beach, Florida